The 2015–16 Kategoria e Dytë is being competed between 24 teams in 2 groups, A and B, respectively.

Changes from last season

Team changes

From Kategoria e Dytë
Promoted to Kategoria e Parë:
 Erzeni
 Korabi
 Turbina

To Kategoria e Dytë
Relegated from Kategoria e Parë:
 Naftëtari
 Tomori
 Veleçiku 

Promoted from Kategoria e Tretë:
 Internacional Tirana
 Kevitan

Participating teams
Group A 

Group B

League table

Group A

Group B

Final

References

3
Albania
Kategoria e Dytë seasons